Nimmagadda is a family name of Indian origin. it may refer to:

 Nimmagadda Prasad (born 1961), Indian industrialist
Nimmagadda Foundation, philanthropic initiative of Nimmagadda Prasad
 Nimmagadda Ramesh Kumar (born 1956), Indian politician